Shahibaug is a locality of the city of Ahmedabad.

History
Shahibaug or Shahibagh, or the Royal Garden palace, was built in 1622 by Shah Jahan then (1616-1622) Viceroy of Ahmedabad, to give work to the poor during a season of scarcity. The palace is now known as Moti Shahi Mahal. The Shahibaug gardens were in the seventeenth century famous, the resort of the whole city, and one of its chief ornaments. A century and a half later (1781), though the well was in ruins and the fountains and water-courses broken, the gardens could still boast of some noble cypresses, cedars, palms, sandals, and cassias, with mango, tamarind, and other spreading fruit trees. Besides the Shahi Baug gardens, there was, a little beyond, an older garden called the Andhari Badi, or dark garden, with large ruins. The palace, always kept in good repair, is thus described by Forbes in 1781:  To the original centre saloon, two large wings and several rooms and terraces were, about 1835, added by Mr. Williams, of the Civil Service. At a little distance from the royal mansion, on the bank of the Sabarmati river, with separate gardens, baths and fountains, was the zanana or ladies' palace. The apartments for the officers and attendants of the court were still further detached. In the great flood of 1875 the strong stone wall, which prevents the river from passing south towards the city, was slightly injured, and sand was washed over it covering and destroying the garden beds. Since this flood, along the wall the water is much deeper and tho current much stronger than it was before. In 1638 the Shahi Baug was very large, shut in by a great wall with ditches full of water. In 1666 Thevenot found the King's garden full of all kinds of trees. The road lay through an avenue like those in Paris. The garden was very large or rather there were several gardens rising like an amphitheatre. There were four wonderful walks fringed, on either side right across the garden, by a terrace full of flowers and meeting in the form of a cross, where was a great building with a roof covered with green tiles.

Locality
The places of interest in Sahibaug include Miya Khan chishty Mosque, Aiwan E Chisht Hutheesing Jain Temple Ahmedabad Cantonment, Camp Hanuman Temple, Calico Museum of Textiles.

Rajasthan Hospital situated in this area is one of the main hospitals of Ahmedabad. The Farki outlet of Shahibaug is known for its lassi. The Civil hospital of Ahmedabad City is also located near Shahibaug.

Shahibaug also served as home to many famous people, including 'Sardar Khwaja Nasiruddin Chishty Rabindranath Tagore, Sardar Patel, Behchar Lashkari and Bhagavatprasad Ranchoddas Family. Rabindranath Tagore stayed in the Moti Shahi Mahal in Shahibaug during his visit to Gujarat and this is where he got inspired for his short story "Hungry Stones".

Shahibaug also includes the Gujarat circuit house which hosts most of the government guests to the city.

Schools 
Schools in Shahibaug include:
 Rachana School
 Kendriya Vidyalaya No 1 - One of a series of schools in India affiliated with CBSE
 Kendriya Vidyalaya No 2 - Second Kendriya Vidyalaya school Near Hanuman Camp
 Rosery School
 Amrut High School
 The H.B.Kapadia New High School
 Aryan Gurukool
Rajasthan English Higher Secondary School.

Connectivity
Shahibaug is connected to Vadaj area by Subhas bridge over River Sabarmati. In 2010, a new flyover was built which now connects the 'Tran khunia bagicha' directly to the Ahmedabad cantonment area.

Politics 
Shahibaug is part of the Asarwa constituency of the Gujarat Legislative Assembly and part of the Ahmedabad West constituency of the Lok Sabha.

References 

Neighbourhoods in Ahmedabad